Douglass is an unincorporated community in western Nacogdoches County, Texas, United States. It is bordered on the west by the Angelina River. There are approximately 500 people who live in the area.

The Douglass Independent School District serves area students. Douglass Indians Baseball: 2014 State Champions

References

Unincorporated communities in Nacogdoches County, Texas
Unincorporated communities in Texas